Sør-Aurdal is a municipality in Innlandet county, Norway. It is located in the traditional district of Valdres. The administrative centre of the municipality is the village of Bagn. Other villages in the municipality include Begna, Hedalen, and Begnadalen.

The  municipality is the 101st largest by area out of the 356 municipalities in Norway. Sør-Aurdal is the 231st most populous municipality in Norway with a population of 2,889.

General information

The parish of Søndre Aurdal was established as a municipality on 1 January 1838 (see formannskapsdistrikt law). On 1 January 1894, the new Etnedal Municipality was established by merging the eastern valley area of Nordre Etnedal (population: 362) from the neighboring Nordre Aurdal municipality and the Søndre Etnedal area (population: 1,331) from the neighboring municipality of Søndre Aurdal. Then on 1 January 1984, the unpopulated northern side of the Makalaus mountain was transferred from Sør-Aurdal to Nord-Aurdal.

Name
The municipality (and parish) was named after the valley in which it is located. The Old Norse form of the valley name was Aurardalr. The first element is the genitive case of an old river name Aur (now called Bøaelva) and the last element is dalr which means "valley" or "dale". The old river name is derived from aurr which means "gravel". Originally the municipality was named Søndre Aurdal. The name was changed from Søndre Aurdal to Sør-Aurdal in the early 20th century. Both søndre and sør- mean "south" (more specifically, "søndre" means "southern"), so the name Sør-Aurdal means "(the) southern (part of) Aurdal". (The Church of Norway parish of Aurdal was divided into two in 1805, just over 30 years before the municipality was established in 1838.)

Coat of arms
The coat of arms was granted by royal decree on 9 February 1990. It is blue with gold silhouette of the gilt-copper medieval reliquary (chasse) that is based on the one found in the Hedal Stave Church except that this one has five blue arches which are inspired by the arches on a similar medieval chasse from the nearby medieval St. Thomas Church at Filefjell (now in the Bergen Museum) and representing the five Church of Norway parishes of the municipality (Bagn, Reinli, Hedalen, Bruflat, and Begnadalen). It also has two dragon heads in the design since Sør-Aurdal is one of only two municipalities in Norway that have two stave churches that are still in use. The color blue was chosen to represent the two river systems in the municipality that were historically important for the logging industry and sawmills in Sør-Aurdal.

Churches
The Church of Norway has five parishes within the municipality of Sør-Aurdal. It is part of the Valdres prosti (deanery) in the Diocese of Hamar.

Geography
Sør-Aurdal municipality is bordered on the north by the municipalities of Nord-Aurdal and Etnedal, on the northeast by Nordre Land, on the east by Søndre Land (all of which are in Innlandet county). It is also bordered on the south by Ringerike and Flå municipalities, and on the west by Nesbyen and Gol municipalities (all of which are in Viken).

Sør-Aurdal is part of the traditional district of Valdres in central, southern Norway, situated between the Gudbrandsdal and Hallingdal valleys. Sør-Aurdal includes parts of several smaller valleys including Begnadalen, Hedalen, Vassfaret, and Vidalen. The river Begna is the main river flowing through the municipality.

History

Reinli Stave Church (built 1190-1250) is the third church on the same location in Reinli. A new tower was added in 1685 and the building was reconditioned by the Society for Preservation of Ancient Buildings in 1885.

Olaf Haraldsson traveled through Valdres in 1023, and also visited Reinli. It is assumed, then, that there was a pagan temple at the same location before the first church, some time before the year 1000.

Hedal Stave Church was built after 1160 and in 1699 it was rebuilt and changed. An old legend says the valley was abandoned during the Black Death and the church later discovered by a bear hunter. A hide is hanging in the church, although now there is only a small part left as visitors have cut away pieces over the years.

Government
All municipalities in Norway, including Sør-Aurdal, are responsible for primary education (through 10th grade), outpatient health services, senior citizen services, unemployment and other social services, zoning, economic development, and municipal roads.  The municipality is governed by a municipal council of elected representatives, which in turn elects a mayor.  The municipality falls under the Vestre Innlandet District Court and the Eidsivating Court of Appeal.

Municipal council
The municipal council  of Sør-Aurdal is made up of 19 representatives that are elected to four year terms.  The party breakdown of the council is as follows:

Mayors
The mayors of Sør-Aurdal (incomplete list):
1945: Arne H. Grøv (V)
1946-1963: Harald Bakken (Ap)
1964-1981: Hallgrim Tronrud (Ap)
1982-1991: Kristoffer Storruste (Ap)
1992-1999: Svein Thorsrud (Sp)
1999-2007: Knut Torgersen (Ap)
2007–2019: Kåre Helland (Sp)
2019–present: Marit Hougsrud (Sp)

Media gallery

Attractions
Bagn Bygdesamling is a museum that is associated with Valdres Folkemuseum. It consists of twelve log houses and a building for permanent displays. A part of the museum is at Sandviken and the farm is Bagnsbergatn.
Bautahaugen Samlinger is another museum that is also associated with Valdres Folkemuseum. It is located in the middle of Hedalen. It consists of a collection of houses and items from Hedalen. The Hedal Stave Church is located just nearby.

Notable residents

 Ola Hermundsen Berge (1768 in Sør-Aurdal - 1825), a Norwegian folk artist and rose painter
 Hans Jacob Stabel (1769–1836), a priest in Sør-Aurdal from 1806; member of the constitutional assembly at Eidsvoll in 1814
 Haldor Boen (1851 in Sør-Aurdal – 1912), an American congressman from Minnesota
 Mikkjel Fønhus (1874 in Sør-Aurdal - 1973), a journalist, novelist and short story writer about animals in the wilderness
 Sigurd Islandsmoen (1881 in Bagn – 1964), a composer of music for the Church of Norway
 Rolf Andvord (1890 in Sør-Aurdal – 1976), a Norwegian jurist and diplomat
 Per Juvkam (1907 in Sør-Aurdal – 2003), a Lutheran Bishop of Bjørgvin 1961-1977
 Ruth Lagesen (1914 in Bagn – 2005), a Norwegian pianist and conductor
 Morten Bakke (born 1968 in Hedalen), a retired football goalkeeper with over 300 club caps

References

External links

Municipal fact sheet from Statistics Norway 

Map of Sør-Aurdal municipality in Kulturnett.no 
Mikkjel Fønhus biography from Dagbladet 

 
Municipalities of Innlandet
1838 establishments in Norway